The Kanichee layered intrusive complex, also called the Kanichee intrusion and Ajax intrusion, is a layered intrusion in Northeastern Ontario, Canada, located in the central portion of Strathy Township about  northwest of the town of Temagami. It consists of mafic-ultramafic rocks and is the largest of many mafic-ultramafic intrusions associated with felsic and mafic metavolcanic rocks in the northern Archean Temagami Greenstone Belt.

Five magmatic cycles have been identified in the Kanichee layered intrusive complex, the first of which formed a PGE deposit with associated gold, copper and nickel mineralization. Ore mineralogy includes pyrrhotite, pentlandite, chalcopyrite and pyrite. The deposit has been quarried by Kanichee Mine.

See also
Volcanism of Canada
Volcanism of Eastern Canada

References

Igneous petrology of Ontario
Layered intrusions
Geology of Temagami
Strathy Township
Ore deposits
Mining in Temagami
Gold mining in Canada
Copper mining
Nickel mining
Palladium mining